The Tragically Hip is the first release from Canadian rock band The Tragically Hip. The EP was produced by Ken Greer of Red Rider fame, and consisted of 7 songs (8 on CD).

Release and reception

The Hip's EP was released in the Kingston area in late 1987 and nationally in January 1988. In early 1988 the Hip went on their first cross-Canada tour lasting 5 weeks. In Dec 1988 they signed a long-term contract with MCA. A live version of "Highway Girl" was released in 1991 as a B-side to "Twist My Arm", in which Gord Downie tells the story of a suicide pact between a man and his girlfriend. It was a hit on Canadian radio, allowing the song to chart considerably higher than in its original form. The story contains some lines which would later recur as lyrics in the band's 1992 single "Locked in the Trunk of a Car"; it ends with Downie exclaiming "Get Mr. Ry Cooder to deliver my eulogy", which would also recur in "At the Hundredth Meridian". The album version was also the only song from this EP to be included in the Yer Favourites fan-picked compilation of 2005.

Track listing

The Tragically Hip
Gord Downie – lead vocals
Rob Baker – lead guitar
Paul Langlois – rhythm guitar
Gord Sinclair – bass guitar, backing vocals
Johnny Fay – drums

References

1987 debut EPs
The Tragically Hip albums
MCA Records EPs